Preston Road is a London Underground station on the Metropolitan line in the London Borough of Brent. It lies between Northwick Park and Wembley Park stations and is in Travelcard Zone 4. It serves the local area of Preston in Wembley and parts of Kenton.

It is served by 'slow' (all stations) trains only (fast and semi-fast trains do not stop at stations between Wembley Park and Harrow-on-the-Hill).

History
A station on the eastern side of the Preston Road bridge was opened on 21 May 1908, and was originally named Preston Road Halt for Uxendon and Kenton; it was later renamed Preston Road. During 1931–32, it was re-sited on the opposite side of the road bridge, and the work was carried out in two stages: the southbound platform was re-sited on 22 November 1931, and the northbound on 3 January 1932.

Decorations

The horticultural displays on the platform have won many awards over the years, but fell into disrepair for some years. With the current refurbishment of the station the floral decorations have since been revived, providing a cheerful touch of colour and a point of interest to entertain the traveller in the wait between trains.

Services 
The off-peak service in trains per hour (tph) is:
 2tph Northbound to Amersham (all stations)
 2tph Northbound to Chesham (all stations)
 8tph Northbound to Uxbridge (all stations)
 4tph Northbound to Watford (all stations)
 4tph Southbound to Baker Street (all stations)
 12tph Southbound to Aldgate via Baker Street (all stations)
The peak time service in trains per hour (tph) is:
 2tph Northbound (morning peak only) to Amersham (all stations)
 2pth Northbound (morning peak only) to Chesham (all stations)
 10tph Northbound to Uxbridge (all stations)
 4tph Southbound to Baker Street (all stations)
 12tph Southbound to Aldgate via Baker Street (all stations)
Note that during evening peaks, services to Amersham or Chesham from Preston Road or Northwick Park require a change at Harrow-On-The-Hill.

During the morning peak (06:30 to 09:30), Fast services from Amersham and Chesham run non-stop southbound only between Moor Park, Harrow-On-The-Hill and Finchley Road whilst Semi-fast services from Watford and Uxbridge run non-stop southbound only between Harrow-On-The-Hill and Finchley Road. During the evening peak (16:30–19:30), Fast and Semi-fast services, which operate northbound only call additionally at Wembley Park.

Connections
London Buses routes 79, 204 and 223 serve the station.

Gallery

References

Metropolitan line stations
Tube stations in the London Borough of Brent
Former Metropolitan Railway stations
Railway stations in Great Britain opened in 1908
Railway stations in Great Britain opened in 1931
Railway stations in Great Britain closed in 1932
1908 establishments in England